Bruce Edward Thornton (born February 14, 1958 in Detroit, Michigan) is a former American football defensive lineman in the National Football League for the Dallas Cowboys and St. Louis Cardinals. He was also a member of the Denver Gold of the United States Football League. He played college football at the University of Illinois.

Early years
Thornton attended Chadsey High School. Besides playing defensive tackle, he was also an accomplished saxophonist and received music scholarships offers.

He accepted a football scholarship from the University of Illinois. As a junior, he was a starter at defensive tackle and led the Big Ten Conference in sacks with 10. In his final year, he was moved to a backup role behind John Thiede, on a team that finished with a record of 1-8-2. He finished his college career with 32 sacks, placing him at the time fifth in school's history.

Professional career

Dallas Cowboys
Thornton was selected by the Dallas Cowboys in the eighth round (219th overall) of the 1979 NFL Draft, after dropping because of his diminished production as a college senior. As a rookie, he helped to compensate the loss of Ed "Too Tall" Jones to his boxing retirement, by coming on passing downs in place of Larry Cole at left defensive end and unofficially finishing second on the team with 6 sacks. His best game came against the Chicago Bears when he registered 2 sacks, one pass defensed and a blocked extra point.

In 1980, the return of Jones reduced his playing time, unofficially posting 3 sacks, including one against Vince Ferragamo in the NFC Wild Card Game. He would remain as a pass-rush specialist during the rest of his career with the Cowboys.

Thornton was waived on August 31, 1981, before being re-signed after Don Smerek injured a knee in the second game of the season and was placed on the injured reserve list. He was cut on September 6, 1982.

St. Louis Cardinals
On September 7, 1982, he was claimed off waivers by the St. Louis Cardinals. He was placed on the injured reserve list on August 30, 1983, before being released on October 4.

Chicago Blitz (USFL)
On November 22, 1983, he was signed by the Chicago Blitz of the United States Football League. On March 28, 1984, he was traded to the Denver Gold in exchange for linebacker Bob Knapton and an undisclosed 1985 draft choice.

Denver Gold (USFL)
In 1985, he led the Denver Gold in sacks with 12.5 (third in the league) and received All-League honors.

Personal life
His son Kalen Thornton also played for the Dallas Cowboys.

References

External links
Cowboys' Thornton has last laugh on Illinois coach

1958 births
Living people
Players of American football from Detroit
American football defensive linemen
Illinois Fighting Illini football players
Dallas Cowboys players
St. Louis Cardinals (football) players
Denver Gold players